Paula Braend (1905–1989) was a German actress.

Selected filmography
 A Heart Beats for You (1949)
 After the Rain Comes Sunshine (1949)
Die Alm an der Grenze (1951)
 The Blue Star of the South (1951)
 The Last Shot (1951)
The Exchange (1952) 
 Oh, You Dear Fridolin (1952)
 The Great Temptation (1952)
House of Life (1952) 
 Scandal at the Girls' School (1953)
The Poacher (1953)
 The Bachelor Trap (1953)
 The Immortal Vagabond (1953)
 Cabaret (1954)
The Czar and the Carpenter (1956)
 The Elephant in a China Shop (1958)
Love Now, Pay Later (1959)
 Jacqueline (1959)
 Oh! This Bavaria! (1960)
 Beloved Augustin (1960)
The Serpent's Egg (1977)

External links

References

German film actresses
People from Starnberg
20th-century German actresses
1905 births
1999 deaths